The Rensselaer Engineers represented Rensselaer Polytechnic Institute in ECAC women's ice hockey during the 2016–17 NCAA Division I women's ice hockey season.

Offseason

April 5:Josefine Hansen playing for the Danish National Team, was named the 2016 IIHF World Championship Best Defenseman.

Recruiting

2016–17 Engineers

Schedule

|-
!colspan=12 style="background:#F7001F;color:white;"| Regular Season

|-
!colspan=12 style="background:#F7001F;color:white;"| ECAC Tournament

References

Rensselaer
RPI Engineers women's ice hockey seasons
RPI 
RPI